The Baron (1842 – 1860) was a Thoroughbred racehorse from Ireland, who also raced in England. Sired by Birdcatcher out of Echidna (by the English stallion Economist), he was also an influential sire in England, France and Australia.

Racing career
A dark chestnut colt with a star, snip, and white sock on his near (left) hind leg, The Baron won three of his four starts at the Curragh in Ireland as a three-year-old before being shipped to England in 1845 by his breeder, veterinary surgeon George Watts. He was then sold to John Scott with whom he won the 1¾-mile St. Leger Stakes and the 2¼-mile Cesarewitch Handicap, the latter under  for 3,200 guineas.  This was the largest purse ever awarded a three-year-old up to that time.  The Baron was then purchased by Edward Rawson Clark.

The Baron raced as a four-year-old in 1846, but did not perform well and suffered from bad feet. Clark sold him to John Mytton, a gambler; after he left Scott, The Baron never won another race. His best result was a second-place finish in the 1846 Craven Stakes at Epsom Downs.

Stud record
He was given in partial payment to the breeder John Theobald, who stood him at Stockwell Stud. After Theobald's death, The Baron was sold to Perrot de Thaunberg of France's National Stud. There he sired many Thoroughbreds, including:
 Baronella (1861) won Poule d'Essai des Poulains (French 2,000 Guineas)
 Dame D'Honneur, won Prix de Diane 
 Etoile De Nord, Prix de Diane 
 Isabella, FR Two Thousand Guineas and Grand Critérium 
 La Toucques (1860), won the French St. Leger Stakes, the Prix du Jockey Club, and the Grosser Preis von Baden. 
 Rataplan, Doncaster Cup, won 42 races, a noted broodmare sire
 Stockwell, winner of the 2,000 Guineas, Newmarket Stakes, Great Yorkshire Stakes, St. Leger Stakes, etc.; a leading sire, his progeny included Doncaster and St. Albans.(GB ) 
Tonnerre Des Indes, won Grand Critérium

Rataplan and Stockwell were full brothers out of the same dam, Pocahontas.

The Baron was known as "The slim and savage" Baron, due to his terrible temperament. Despite rough treatment at his French stud, he had a great influence on French Thoroughbred bloodlines; several of his progeny were also exported to Australia. The Baron died in 1860.

Pedigree

See also
Doncaster (horse)
John Scott (horseman)
Stockwell (horse)

References

1842 racehorse births
1860 racehorse deaths
Racehorses trained in the United Kingdom
Racehorses bred in Ireland
Thoroughbred family 24
St Leger winners